Mark Robson (4 December 1913 – 20 June 1978) was a Canadian-American film director, producer, and editor. Robson began his 45-year career in Hollywood as a film editor. He later began working as a director and producer. He directed 34 films during his career, including Champion (1949), Bright Victory (1951), The Bridges at Toko-Ri (1954), Peyton Place (1957), The Inn of the Sixth Happiness (1958), Von Ryan's Express (1965), Valley of the Dolls (1967), and Earthquake (1974).

Robson was twice nominated for the Academy Award for Best Director – for Peyton Place and The Inn of the Sixth Happiness – as well as four nominations for the Directors Guild of America Award for Outstanding Directing in Feature Films. Two of his films were nominated for the Cannes Film Festival's Palme d'Or. In 1960, he received a star on the Hollywood Walk of Fame for his contributions to the motion picture industry.

Early life and education
Born in Montreal, he attended Roslyn Elementary School and Westmount High School in Montreal. He later studied at the University of California, Los Angeles and Pacific Coast University School of Law. Robson then found work in the prop department at 20th Century Fox studios. He eventually went to work at RKO Pictures where he began training as a film editor.

Career

Editor
In 1940, he worked as an assistant to Robert Wise on the editing of Citizen Kane, the film debut of Orson Welles. He and Wise also edited Welles' next movie, The Magnificent Ambersons (1942), and made drastic cuts to the ending of the film, which Welles disagreed with.

Robson was promoted to editor for The Falcon's Brother (1942), an RKO B picture. He then edited Journey into Fear (1943), made by Orson Welles' company. The editing was again done without Welles' involvement.

Work with Val Lewton
Both Robson and Wise benefited from producer and screenwriter Val Lewton, who was supervising a series of low budget horror films at RKO that have since become legendary. The first was Cat People (1942), directed by Jacques Tourneur. Robson edited Lewton's next two films, both directed by Tourneur, I Walked with a Zombie (1943) and The Leopard Man (1943).

Director
Lewton was so impressed with Robson's work that he promoted him to director for The Seventh Victim (1943). Lewton liked the result, so Robson directed The Ghost Ship (1943). Lewton also gave Robert Wise his first directing job, on The Curse of the Cat People (1944).

Lewton wanted to make non-horror films and RKO allowed him to make Youth Runs Wild (1944), a juvenile delinquency story; Robson directed, but the film was not a commercial success. More popular was Isle of the Dead (1945) starring Boris Karloff. Lewton, Karloff and Robson reunited on Bedlam (1946), which lost money at the box office and turned out to be the last horror movie produced by Lewton.

Leaving RKO
Robson's success at RKO led to work on major film projects, and in 1949 he was nominated for the Directors Guild of America Award for Outstanding Directorial Achievement in Motion Pictures for his work on the film noir Champion, produced by Stanley Kramer. Robson directed another film for Kramer, Home of the Brave (1949), one of the first films to deal with the issue of racism.

Next Robson directed Roughshod (1949), a Western, for RKO, and My Foolish Heart (also 1949), a melodrama for producer Sam Goldwyn. Goldwyn then used Robson for Edge of Doom (1950) and I Want You (1951). At Universal Robson made Bright Victory (1951).

Robson briefly brought Val Lewton and Robert Wise into a partnership for film and television production, only to drop the ailing Lewton without explanation a few months later. Robson and Wise produced Return to Paradise (1953), starring Gary Cooper. For Warwick Films, Robson directed Alan Ladd in Hell Below Zero (1954). He made a comedy at Columbia, Phffft (1954), then had one of the biggest hits in his career with The Bridges at Toko-Ri (1954). This film won him another DGA nomination. Warwick Films used him again for A Prize of Gold (1955). He went to MGM to make Trial (1955). His boxing film, The Harder They Fall (1956), was based on a novel by Budd Schulberg.

The Little Hut (1957), for MGM, was a huge hit. Even bigger was Peyton Place (1957), for 20th Century Fox. Robson was nominated for an Academy Award for Best Director. He was nominated again the following year for directing Ingrid Bergman in The Inn of the Sixth Happiness. For these films, he also received his third and fourth Directors Guild of America nominations.

Producer
Robson produced and directed From the Terrace (1960) starring Paul Newman. He produced The Inspector (1962) and Nine Hours to Rama (1963), the latter of which he also directed. After completing that film, Robson left Fox after a five-year association.

Robson and Newman reunited on The Prize (1963) for MGM. It was a hit, as was Von Ryan's Express (1965), starring Frank Sinatra, back at Fox.

Robson produced and directed Lost Command (1966), a tale of the French Foreign Legion, and directed 1967's Valley of the Dolls, a film panned by the critics, but a success at the box office.

Later films
Robson made a series of films that were commercially disappointing: Daddy's Gone A-Hunting (1969), Happy Birthday, Wanda June (1971), and Limbo (1972). In 1974, he directed Earthquake, the film that introduced "Sensurround".

Personal life
Robson was married to Sarah Naomi Riskind from 1936 until his death on 20 June 1978, from a heart attack in London after completing Avalanche Express. The film was released a year after his death. The couple had three children.

Robson is interred in Mount Sinai Memorial Park Cemetery in Los Angeles.

For his contribution to the motion picture industry, he has a star on the Hollywood Walk of Fame at 1722 Vine Street.

Filmography

Editor
 Citizen Kane (1941, assistant editor, uncredited)
 The Magnificent Ambersons (1942, assistant editor, uncredited)
 Mail Trouble (1942) 
 The Falcon's Brother (1942)
 Cat People (1942)
 Journey into Fear (1943)
 I Walked with a Zombie (1943)
 The Leopard Man (1943)

Director
The Seventh Victim (1943)
The Ghost Ship (1943)
Youth Runs Wild (1944)
Isle of the Dead (1945)
Bedlam (1946, also screenwriter)
Champion (1949)
Roughshod (1949)
Home of the Brave (1949)
My Foolish Heart (1949)
Edge of Doom (1950)
Bright Victory (1951)
I Want You (1951)
Return to Paradise (1953, also producer)
Hell Below Zero (1954)
Phffft! (1954)
The Bridges at Toko-Ri (1955)
A Prize of Gold (1955)
Trial (1955)
The Harder They Fall (1956)
The Little Hut (1957, also producer)
Peyton Place (1957)
The Inn of the Sixth Happiness (1958)
From the Terrace (1960, also producer)
 The Inspector (1962, producer only)
Nine Hours to Rama (1963, also producer)
The Prize (1963)
Von Ryan's Express (1965)
Lost Command (1966, also producer)
Valley of the Dolls (1967, also producer)
Daddy's Gone A-Hunting (1969, also producer)
Happy Birthday, Wanda June (1971, also producer)
Limbo (1972)
Earthquake (1974, also producer)
Avalanche Express (1979, also producer)

References

External links

 
 

1913 births
1978 deaths
American film directors
American film producers
American film editors
American people of Russian-Jewish descent
Anglophone Quebec people
Burials at Mount Sinai Memorial Park Cemetery
Film producers from Quebec
Canadian film editors
Canadian expatriate film directors in the United States
Canadian people of Russian-Jewish descent
Film directors from Montreal
University of California, Los Angeles alumni
People with acquired American citizenship